Penicillium ochrosalmoneum is an anamorph, ascosporic species in the genus Penicillium which produces citreoviridin.

Further reading

References 

ochrosalmoneum
Fungi described in 1959